Neil Crosby is an academic valuer, Professor of Real Estate at the University of Reading.

He has been instrumental in changing property valuation practices in the United Kingdom through a series of journal publications in the late 1980s and early 1990s, which dealt with questions of investment property valuation methodology, and through an influential book (Property Investment Appraisal, co-authored with Andrew Baum and now nearing its third edition). The RICS adopted the 'Short-cut DCF' method (a.k.a. the 'Real-value' method) proposed by Crosby, in the 1997 Valuation Information Paper: Commercial Investment Property - Valuation Methods.

In 2002, he was awarded the International Real Estate Society’s annual achievement award for his work in real estate research, education and practice.

See also
Income approach

Further reading
Baum, A. and Crosby, N. (1988) Property Investment Appraisal (Second Edition), Routledge, London.
RICS (1997) ''Commercial Investment Property: Valuation Methods - An Information Paper.

References

External links
Professor Neil Crosby, official web-page at the University of Reading.

Academics of the University of Reading
Valuation professionals
Year of birth missing (living people)
Living people